411th may refer to:

411th Bombardment Group, inactive United States Air Force unit
411th Bombardment Squadron, part of the 6th Air Mobility Wing at MacDill Air Force Base, Florida
411th Civil Affairs Battalion (United States) (Tactical), civil affairs (CA) unit of the United States Army
411th Engineer Brigade (United States), combat engineer brigade of the United States Army headquartered in New Windsor, New York
411th Fighter Squadron or 196th Reconnaissance Squadron, unit of the California Air National Guard
411th Flight Test Squadron (411 FLTS), part of the 412th Test Wing based at Edwards Air Force Base, California
411th Support Brigade (United States), support brigade of the United States Army

See also
411 (number)
411 (disambiguation), including the year 411 (CDXI) of the Julian calendar
411 BC